K. G. Rajasekharan (February 14, 1947 - March 21, 2019) was an Indian film director in Malayalam movies. He had directed 20 Malayalam movies. He directed his debut movie Padmatheertham in 1978.

Personal life

He was born to Edava Kurunilakode Kadakathuveettil Govinda Kuruppu and J Kamalaksiyamma on 12 February 1947. He completed B.Sc. from Kollam S.N. College. He started his movie career as an assistant director in the movie Midumidukki in 1968.

Filmography

Direction
 Padmatheertham (1978)
 Velluvili (1978)
 Indradhanussu (1979)
 Yakshippaaru (1979)
 Vaaleduthavan Vaalaal (1979)
 Vijayam Nammude Senaani (1979)
 Thirayum Theeravum (1980)
 Ival Ee Vazhi Ithu vare (1980)
 Anthappuram (1980)
 Avan Oru Ahankaari (1980)
 Saahasam (1981)
 Paanchajanyam (1982)
 Maattuvin Chattangale (1982)
 Chambalkaadu (1982)
 Beedikkunjamma (1982)
 Shaari Alla Shaarada  (1982)
 Mynaakam (1984)
 Chillukottaram (1985)
 Thozhil Allengil Jail (1985)
 Simhadhwani (1992)

Story
 Yakshippaaru (1979)

Screenplay
 Anthappuram (1980)

References

External links

Malayalam film directors
Malayalam screenwriters
1947 births
2019 deaths
Film directors from Thiruvananthapuram
20th-century Indian film directors
Screenwriters from Thiruvananthapuram